Günther Grünsteudel (born in 1954) is a German librarian who has become known through his publications on musicology and regional topics concerning Augsburg.

He compiled the Woll-Werke-Verzeichnis (WWV) of the works of composer Erna Woll.

Publications 
 Canadiana-Bibliographie. Veröffentlichungen deutschsprachiger Kanadisten 1980–1987. Brockmeyer, Bochum 1989 . 2nd edition 1993, .
 Erna Woll. Ein Werkverzeichnis. Wissner, Augsburg 1996, .
 with Edwin Michler, Hermann Ullrich: Johann Melchior Dreyer. Ein ostschwäbischer Kirchenmusiker um 1800. Supplement to the concert (28 April) and the exhibition (28 April - 5 May 1996) in the former Cistercian convent of Kirchheim am Ries. Rieser Kulturtage, Nördlingen 1996,  (online, PDF; 82 kB).
 with Günter Hägele, Rudolf Frankenberger (ed.): Augsburger Stadtlexikon. 2nd edition. Perlach, Augsburg 1998,  (online).
 Wallerstein. Das schwäbische Mannheim. Booklet accompanying the exhibition of the Augsburg University Library, Wallerstein, Neues Schloß, 1. Juni – 9. Juli 2000. Rieser Kulturtage, Nördlingen 2000,  (Excerpt).
 Canadiana-Bibliographie 1900–2000. Veröffentlichungen deutschsprachiger Kanadisten. ISL, Hagen 2001,  (numerized des Zentrums für Kanada-Studien der Universität Trier, 2003, PDF; 1,8 MB).
 Musik für die Synagoge. Universitäts-Bibliothek, Augsburg 2008, .

References

External links 

German librarians
1954 births
Living people